The 2016–17 season is Ittihad Riadi Tanger's 34th in existence and the club's 18th season in the top flight of Moroccan football, and second consecutive season in the first division of Moroccan football after an absence of eight years. The team participated in CAF Confederation Cup for the first time in his history after finishing third in the domestic championship.

Kit
Supplier: Bang Sports / Main Sponsors: front: Moroccan Airports Authority, University of New England; APM Terminals / League Sponsor: front: Maroc Telecom

Players

squad

*

 (vice-captain)

*

 (captain)

*

* Not in the CCC squad list.

From youth squad

Out during the season

Transfers

In (summer)

 IRTfoot.ma
 IRTfoot.ma
 IRTfoot.ma
 IRTfoot.ma
 IRTfoot.ma
 IRTfoot.ma
 IRTfoot.ma
 IRTfoot.ma
 IRTfoot.ma
 IRTfoot.ma
  IRTfoot.ma
 IRTfoot.ma
 IRTfoot.ma

Out (Summer)

 IRTfoot.ma
 IRTfoot.ma
 IRTfoot.ma
 IRTfoot.ma
 IRTfoot.ma
 IRTfoot.ma
 IRTfoot.ma
 IRTfoot.ma
 IRTfoot.ma

 IRTfoot.ma

In (winter)

 IRTfoot.ma
 IRTfoot.ma
 IRTfoot.ma
 IRTfoot.ma

Out (winter)

 IRTfoot.ma
 IRTfoot.ma
 IRTfoot.ma
 IRTfoot.ma

Technical staff 

until 16 April 2017

until 30 April 2017

Statistics

Goal scorers

Assists

Hat-tricks

(H) – Home ; (A) – Away

Clean sheets
As of 25 May 2017.

Disciplinary record

Squad statistics
As of 25 May 2017.

|-
|colspan=12 align="center"|Players left the club in transfer windows or mid-season

|}

Pre-season and friendlies

Competitions

Overall

Overview

Botola

League table

Results summary

Results by round

Matches

Results overview

Coupe du Trône

Round of 16

Quarter-finals

Semi-finals

CAF Confederation Cup

Qualifying rounds

Preliminary round

First round

Play-off round

See also
2015–16 IR Tanger season

References

External links

Moroccan football club seasons
Ittihad Tanger
2016–17 in Moroccan football